Rachmat Kartolo (13 March 1938 – 18 September 2001) was an Indonesian actor and singer.

Early life
Rachmat Kartolo was one of five children born to Kartolo and Roekiah, two film actors active with Tan's Film, on 13 March 1938. After Roekiah's death, Kartolo brought the children to his hometown at Yogyakarta. In the city, the Indonesian capital during the later days of the Indonesian National Revolution, Rachmat lost one of his siblings and, in 1949, his father. After the Dutch recognised Indonesia's independence, Rachmat and his surviving siblings – Jusuf, Imam, and Sri Wahjuni – were brought to Jakarta and raised by their father's friend, Adikarso. There Rachmat completed his education, graduating from senior high school before entering the National Theatre Academy of Indonesia.

Career
Adikarso introduced Rachmat to music and the recording industry; Rachmat and his brothers performed at Wisma Nusantara in Harmoni, Jakarta, under their guardian's supervision. In 1958 Rachmat and his brothers established a band. Though Jusuf and Imam later left, Rachmat went on to solo success. At the time the government under president Sukarno forbade the use of English-language music, and thus, the Encyclopedia of Jakarta writes, Indonesian popular music was in search of its identity. Rachmat used sounds inspired from country music, and his songs were mostly about romance. His first hit, in 1963, was "Patah Hati" ("Heartbroken"), written by his brother Imam. The song had another burst of popularity in 1984, allowing him to buy a new car.

Though he initially showed no interest in film, in 1964 Rachmat appeared in his first production, Kunanti Djawabanmu (I Await your Reply). By 1977 he had completed more than 20 films. In 1975 he established his own production house, Mafin Film, and in 1978 he made his directorial debut with Tengkorak Hitam (Black Skull). Even after entering film he continued to record albums, first on gramophone records then on cassettes.

From his debut until his final role in Titisan Dewi (1990), Rachmat appeared in more than 40 films, including action flicks such as Matjan Kemajoran (1965), comedies such as Benyamin Jatuh Cinta (1976), and dramas such as Bernafas dalam Lumpur (1970). He directed a total of four films: Tengkorak Hitam, Masih Adakah Cinta (1980), Jangan Sakiti Hatinya (1980) and Mat Pelor (1990).

Death
Rachmat died on 18 September 2001. In June of that year he had made a stage performance in Blitar, as former president Sukarno in a memorial performance.

References

Works cited

External links

 

1938 births
2001 deaths
Indonesian male film actors
20th-century Indonesian male singers
Indonesian film directors
Male actors from Jakarta
Singers from Jakarta